Weekend Update has been a platform for Saturday Night Live characters to grow and gain popularity ever since Gilda Radner used it to create Emily Litella and Roseanne Roseannadanna.  Many cast members have used Update as the primary vehicle for a certain character.  Don Novello was featured almost exclusively on the news segment as his breakout character, Father Guido Sarducci, and Tim Kazurinsky, in the face of Eddie Murphy's overshadowing popularity, created characters almost exclusively for Update.  Before becoming an anchor on Update, Colin Quinn used the segment as his main sounding board as well.

Significant characters who appeared chiefly on Weekend Update are listed here in chronological order of their first appearance.
 Emily Litella (Gilda Radner) – November 15, 1975
Baba Wawa (Gilda Radner)
Audrey Peart Dickman (Jane Curtin)
Debbie Doodie (Gilda Radner)
 Roseanne Roseannadanna (Gilda Radner) – January 21, 1978 (first overall appearance was in a fake commercial called "Hire the Incompetent" which aired on the season 3 episode hosted by Charles Grodin)
 Lester Crackfield (Al Franken) – February 18, 1978
 Father Guido Sarducci (Don Novello) – May 13, 1978
 Chico Escuela (Garrett Morris) – November 11, 1978
 Big Vic Ricker (Harry Shearer) – January 26, 1980
Raheem Abdul Muhammed (Eddie Murphy)
 Dr. Jack Badofsky (Tim Kazurinsky) – March 20, 1982
 Siobhan Cahill (Mary Gross) – January 22, 1983
 Dwight MacNamara (Gary Kroeger) – November 12, 1983
 Worthington Clotman (Tim Kazurinsky) – January 28, 1984
 Wayne Huevos (Tim Kazurinsky) – February 18, 1984
 Lew Goldman (Billy Crystal) – October 13, 1984
 Buddy Young, Jr. (Billy Crystal) – October 20, 1984
 Nathan Thurm (Martin Short) – November 17, 1984
 Tommy Flanagan, the Pathological Liar (Jon Lovitz) – November 16, 1985
 Babette (Nora Dunn) – April 19, 1986
 Mr. Subliminal (Kevin Nealon) – October 11, 1986
 A Grumpy Old Man (Dana Carvey) – February 11, 1989
 Annoying Man (Jon Lovitz) – November 11, 1989
 Queen Shenequa (Ellen Cleghorne) – October 26, 1991
 Jan Brady (Melanie Hutsell) – January 11, 1992
 Cajun Man (Adam Sandler) – February 8, 1992
 Buster Jenkins (Chris Rock) – February 15, 1992
 Opera Man (Adam Sandler) – April 18, 1992
 Hank Fielding (Robert Smigel) – November 14, 1992
 Bennett Brauer (Chris Farley) – April 10, 1993
 The British Fops (Mark McKinney, David Koechner) – November 11, 1995
 Joe Blow (Colin Quinn) – November 18, 1995
 Gary Macdonald (David Koechner) – December 2, 1995
 Lenny The Lion (Colin Quinn) – December 9, 1995
 Cinder Calhoun (Ana Gasteyer) – November 23, 1996
 Dominican Lou (Tracy Morgan) – March 22, 1997
 Gunner Olsen (Jim Breuer) – March 7, 1998
 Jacob Silj (Will Ferrell) – December 4, 1999
 Jasper Hahn (Horatio Sanz) – January 8, 2000
 Jeannie Darcy (Molly Shannon) – November 18, 2000
 Gay Hitler (Chris Kattan) – October 13, 2001
 Drunk Girl  (Jeff Richards) – December 8, 2001
 Fericito (Fred Armisen) – October 5, 2002
 Tim Calhoun (Will Forte) – October 19, 2002
 The Kelly Brothers (Fred Armisen, Will Forte) – February 8, 2003
 Billy Smith (Fred Armisen) – October 18, 2003
 Jorge Rodriguez (Horatio Sanz) – May 1, 2004
 Jon Bovi (Will Forte, Jason Sudeikis) – October 7, 2006
 Two Gay Guys from Jersey (Fred Armisen, Bill Hader) – October 28, 2006
 Aunt Linda (Kristen Wiig) – December 2, 2006
 Nicholas Fehn (Fred Armisen) – October 13, 2007
 Roger A. Trevanti (Fred Armisen) – November 3, 2007 (was a one-shot character that gained a following on YouTube videos during the 2007–2008 Writers' Guild of America strike)
 Judy Grimes (Kristen Wiig) – April 12, 2008
 Jean K. Jean (Kenan Thompson) – March 8, 2008
 Garth and Kat (Fred Armisen, Kristen Wiig) – December 19, 2009
 Stefon (Bill Hader) – April 24, 2010 (first overall appearance was in a one-shot sketch on the season 34 episode hosted by Ben Affleck)
 Anthony Crispino (Bobby Moynihan) – October 2, 2010
 Drunk Uncle (Bobby Moynihan)
 Cathy Anne (Cecily Strong)
 Jebidiah Atkinson the 1860s newspaper critic (Taran Killam)
 Best Friends from Growing Up (Fred Armisen and Vanessa Bayer)
 The Girl You Wish You Hadn't Started a Conversation with at a Party (Cecily Strong) – November 3, 2012 (first overall appearance was on the September 27, 2012 Weekend Update Thursday)
 Angel, Every Boxer's Girlfriend from Every Movie About Boxing Ever (Heidi Gardner) – November 4, 2017
 Chen Biao (Bowen Yang), a Chinese trade commissioner (or "trade daddy") who is now a health minister because of the coronavirus epidemic.

References

See also
 Recurring Saturday Night Live characters and sketches
 Recurring Saturday Night Live characters and sketches (listed chronologically)
 Saturday Night Live TV show sketches
 Saturday Night Live commercials
 Saturday Night Live musical sketches

Lists of recurring Saturday Night Live characters and sketches